Fabián Gastón Henríquez (born 8 June 1995) is an Argentine professional footballer who plays as a midfielder for Argentine Primera División side Huracán.

Career
Henríquez had youth spells with Rosario Central, All Boys and Godoy Cruz. He started his senior career with Godoy Cruz in 2011. On 25 September 2015, Henríquez made his professional debut in a loss at the Estadio Roberto Natalio Carminatti against Olimpo. That was his only appearance in 2015, prior to twenty-seven games in all competitions over the course of 2016 and 2016–17. During that period, Henríquez scored his first senior goal (vs. Estudiantes, Copa Argentina) on 19 July 2016 and was sent off for the first time (vs. Racing Club, Argentine Primera División) on 25 March 2017.

On 2 July 2021, Henríquez joined Huracán on a deal until the end of 2022.

Career statistics
.

References

External links

1995 births
Living people
Sportspeople from Mendoza, Argentina
Argentine footballers
Association football midfielders
Argentine Primera División players
Godoy Cruz Antonio Tomba footballers
Club Atlético Huracán footballers